The Smoky Mountains are a small range of mountains on the Moon near the Apollo 16 landing site.

References

Mountains on the Moon